Sidhi Kumari is a member of Legislative assembly from Bikaner East (Rajasthan Assembly constituency) ever since the creation of this constituency seat(after delimitation) in 2008. She got elected from Bikaner East in 2008, 2013 and 2018 respectively as a candidate of Bharatiya Janata Party.

She was born in 1973 in the erstwhile Royal family of Bikaner. She had studied up to M A & also serves as director of Museum at Lalgarh Palace. She is daughter of Narendra Singh Bahadur & grand daughter of Maharajah Sri Dr. Karni Singh Bahadur of Bikaner.

She is fondly called Bai Sa (beloved daughter) in Bikaner. She speaks less but is still popular among local public because of effective allocation of Funds to Public for Development Works. Quite popular among the public despite being absent on issues of public interest. She built a museum at the age of 25. In this museum, things related to her mother and grandmother are kept.

References 

 Sidhi Kumari

People from Bikaner
Rajasthan MLAs 2008–2013
1973 births
Women in Rajasthan politics
Living people
Rajasthan MLAs 2013–2018
21st-century Indian women politicians
21st-century Indian politicians
Rajasthan MLAs 2018–2023